The Miss Tennessee's Outstanding Teen competition is the competition that selects the representative for the U.S. state of Tennessee in the Miss America's Outstanding Teen pageant. The pageant is held each March.

Jane Marie Franks of Clifton was crowned Miss Tennessee's Outstanding Teen on June 25, 2022 at the Cannon Center for Performing Arts in Memphis, Tennessee. She competed in the Miss America's Outstanding Teen 2023 pageant at the Hyatt Regency Dallas in Dallas, Texas on August 12, 2022.

Results summary
The results of Miss Tennessee's Outstanding Teen as they participated in the national Miss America's Outstanding Teen competition. The year in parentheses indicates the year of the Miss America's Outstanding Teen competition the award/placement was garnered.

Placements
 1st runners-up: Lexie Perry (2015)
 3rd runners-up: Leah Beth Bolton (2007), Taylor Parsons (2020)
 Top 10: Madeline Littrell (2006)

Awards

Preliminary awards
 Preliminary Lifestyle & Fitness: Leah Beth Bolton (2007), Devin Grissom (2008)
 Preliminary Talent: Lexie Perry (2015), Taylor Parsons (2020)

Non-finalist awards
 Non-finalist Interview: Haley Butler (2013)

Other awards
 Outstanding Instrumental Talent Award: Lexie Perry (2015)
 Overall Dance Talent: Taylor Parsons (2020)
 Teens in Action Award Finalists: Mary Humphrey (2018)

Winners

Notes

References

External links
 Official website

Tennessee
Tennessee culture
Women in Tennessee
Annual events in Tennessee